Parapluda invitabilis is a species of moth in the family Limacodidae and in the subfamily Limacodinae.

Distribution 
Parapluda invitabilis occurs in Botswana, DR Congo, Djibouti, Ethiopia, Gabon, Malawi, Mozambique, South Africa, Tanzania, Uganda, Zambia and Zimbabwe.

References 

Moths described in 1860
Limacodinae